The 1964 County Championship was the 65th officially organised running of the County Championship. Worcestershire won their first Championship title.

Worcestershire's 41-point margin over the second-placed team was the largest in the competition since 1957, and they won the title with three matches to spare. They went to the top of the county table on 7 August from their Midlands rivals, Warwickshire, and finished the season with seven wins and a draw from their last eight matches to clinch the championship.

Table

10 points for a win
5 points to each side for a tie
5 points to side still batting in a match in which scores finish level
2 points for first innings lead in a match drawn or lost
1 point for first innings tie in a match lost
If no play possible on the first two days, and the match does not go into the second innings, the side leading on first innings scores 6 points. If the scores are level, the side batting second scores 3 points.
Position determined by points gained. If equal, then decided on most wins.
Each team plays 28 matches.

Notes: Surrey and Worcestershire one point each for tie on first innings in match drawn; Gloucestershire and Hampshire one point each for tie on first innings in match lost. Hampshire five points in drawn match when scores finished level and they were batting.

References

1964 in English cricket
County Championship seasons